Lloyd Biggle Jr. (April 17, 1923 – September 12, 2002), was an American musician, author, and internationally known oral historian.

Biography
Biggle was born in 1923 in Waterloo, Iowa. He served in World War II as a communications sergeant in a rifle company of the 102nd Infantry Division; during the war, he was wounded twice. His second wound, a shrapnel wound in his leg received near the Elbe River at the end of the war, left him disabled for life.

After the war, Biggle resumed his education. He received an A.B. Degree with High Distinction from Wayne State University and M.M. and Ph.D. degrees from the University of Michigan. Biggle taught at the University of Michigan and at Eastern Michigan University in the 1950s. He began writing professionally in 1955 and became a full-time writer with the publication of his novel, All the Colors of Darkness in 1963; he continued in the writing profession until his death.

Career
Biggle was celebrated in science fiction circles as the author who introduced aesthetics into a literature known for its scientific and technological complications. His stories frequently used musical and artistic themes. Such notables as songwriter Jimmy Webb and novelist Orson Scott Card have written of the tremendous effect that his early story, "The Tunesmith", had on them in their youth. Among Biggle's enduring science fiction creations were the matter-transmission trouble-shooting team of Jan Darzek/Effie Schlupe, and the Cultural Survey, featured in novels and magazine stories, through which Biggle explored issues of multi-culturalism and technology.

In the field of mystery writing, Biggle's Grandfather Rastin stories appeared for many years in Ellery Queen's Mystery Magazine. He loved writing historical fiction set in late Victorian and Edwardian England. He wrote a series of new Sherlock Holmes stories from the perspective of Edward Porter Jones, an assistant who began his association with Holmes as a "Baker Street Irregular"; several stories, including "The Quallsford Inheritance" and "The Glendower Conspiracy", feature Jones and Holmes. These were followed by a series of stories featured in Alfred Hitchcock's Mystery Magazine starring Biggle's Victorian sleuth, Lady Sara Varnley.

Both Biggle's science fiction and mystery stories have received international acclaim, being nominated for the 1962 Hugo for short fiction, and also for the Locus Readers awards in 1972, 1973, and 1974. He published two dozen books as well as magazine stories and numerous articles. His last novel was The Chronocide Mission. He was writing almost to the moment of his death. "I can write them faster than the magazines can publish them," he once said, and indeed, magazines continued to publish backlogged stories of his well after his death.  Few of his works have been in print since the early 2000s, but most of his novels are available as e-books.

Biggle was the founding Secretary-Treasurer of Science Fiction Writers of America and served as Chairman of its trustees for many years. In the 1970s, he founded the Science Fiction Oral History Association, which built archives containing hundreds of cassette tapes of science fiction notables making speeches and discussing aspects of their craft. He numbered many of these science fiction notables among his friends, and his article in the July/August 2002 Analog Magazine, "Isaac Asimov Remembered", was based in part on his personal recollections of that celebrity.

He was a member of the Veterans of Foreign Wars, the Disabled American Veterans, and the Military Order of the Purple Heart.

He died at the end of a twenty-year battle with leukemia and cancer.

Bibliography

References

External links
 
 
 
 Lloyd Biggle Papers at the Kenneth Spencer Research Library at the University of Kansas

1923 births
2002 deaths
20th-century American novelists
21st-century American novelists
American male novelists
American science fiction writers
United States Army non-commissioned officers
United States Army personnel of World War II
American male short story writers
University of Michigan School of Music, Theatre & Dance alumni
20th-century American short story writers
21st-century American short story writers
20th-century American male writers
21st-century American male writers
Deaths from leukemia
Deaths from cancer in the United States